Ryan Millar is a Scottish professional footballer, who played for Falkirk .

Career

Falkirk
A member of Falkirk's Under 19 team Millar made his first team debut as a substitute in Falkirk's 2–1 win over Dundee in the Scottish First Division on 17 September 2011.

Career statistics

References

External links

Living people
Falkirk F.C. players
Scottish Football League players
Scottish footballers
Alloa Athletic F.C. players
Stenhousemuir F.C. players
Year of birth missing (living people)
Place of birth missing (living people)
Association football forwards